Arnold F. Emch (24 March 1871 – 1959) was an American mathematician, known for his work on the inscribed square problem.

Emch received his Ph.D. in 1895 at the University of Kansas under the supervision of Henry Byron Newson. In the late 1890s until 1905 he was an assistant professor of graphic mathematics in the school of engineering at the Kansas State Agricultural College (now Kansas State University). In 1905 Emch became a professor of mathematics at the Kantonsschule in Solothurn, Switzerland. In 1908 Emch gave a lecture at the International Congress of Mathematicians in Rome. From 1911 to 1939 he was a professor at the University of Illinois Urbana-Champaign.

His wife was Hilda Walters Emch (1875–1962) and they had two sons, Walter Emch and Arnold Frederick Emch (1899–1989), a well-known management consultant.

Selected publications
 (PhD dissertation)

References

External links
 

1871 births
1959 deaths
19th-century American mathematicians
20th-century American mathematicians
University of Kansas alumni
University of Illinois Urbana-Champaign faculty